Abacetus punctibasis is a species of ground beetle in the subfamily Pterostichinae. It was described by Straneo in 1940.

References

punctibasis
Beetles described in 1940